The Venezuela national under-23 football team, also known as the Venezuela Olympic football team, represents Venezuela in international men's football during Olympic Games and Pan American Games. The selection is limited to players under the age of 23, except for three overage players. The team is controlled by the Venezuelan Football Federation.

Competitive record

Olympic Games

CONMEBOL Pre-Olympic Tournament

Pan American Games

Results and fixtures

2020

Current squad
Head coach: Amleto Bonaccorso
 
The 23-man squad was announced on 31 December 2019.

Honours
 Pan American Games:
 Fourth place (2): 1951, 1955
 South American Games:
  Silver Medalists: 1994
 Bolivarian Games:
  Silver Medalists (6): 1947-48 (shared), 1951, 1965, 1970, 1977, 2005
  Bronze Medalists (7): 1961, 1981, 1993, 1997, 2001, 2009, 2017

References

F
South American national under-23 association football teams